Phyllanthus warnockii, the sand reverchonia, is a plant species of the family Phyllanthaceae. It is a sand dune annual and confined to the Southwestern United States and adjacent Mexico. It is poisonous to mammals. Members of the Hopi Tribe in northeastern Arizona sometimes traditionally used the berries to oil and season piki cooking slabs. It was also used by the Hopi medicinally in cases of postpartum hemorrhage.

References

warnockii